Interstate 210 may refer to:

 Interstate 210 (California) or the Foothill Freeway, a major east–west freeway running through the valleys north and east of Los Angeles
 Interstate 210 (Louisiana), a bypass route in Lake Charles
 Interstate 310 (Mississippi), a proposed freeway in Biloxi, originally proposed as Interstate 210
 Interstate 165 in Mobile, Alabama, previously designated as Interstate 210

10-2
2